Camptopsestis is a monotypic moth genus in the family Drepanidae described by Yoshimoto in 1983. Its only species, Camptopsestis malayana, was described by the same author in the same year. It is found on Peninsular Malaysia, Sumatra and Borneo. The habitat consists of peat swamp forests and lowland to high montane areas.

References

Thyatirinae
Monotypic moth genera
Drepanidae genera